Abdel Meguid Amir (born 18 June 1961), also known as Amir Abdel Meguid or Amr Abduelkhir, is an Egyptian former basketball player.

Career
Amir competed for Egypt at the 1984 and the 1988 Summer Olympics, where he scored 97 points in 13 games. He also competed at the 1990 FIBA World Championship.

References

External links 
  (1984 Olympic Games)
  (1984 Olympics)
  (1988 Olympics, 1990 World Championship)
  (1988 Olympics)
  (1984 and 1988 Olympics)

1961 births
Living people
Egyptian men's basketball players
Olympic basketball players of Egypt
Basketball players at the 1984 Summer Olympics
Basketball players at the 1988 Summer Olympics
1990 FIBA World Championship players